Yttrium orthovanadate (YVO4) is a transparent crystal. Undoped YVO4 is also used to make efficient high-power polarizing prisms similar to Glan–Taylor prisms.

There are two principal applications for doped Yttrium orthovanadate:

Doped with neodymium it forms Nd:YVO4, an active laser medium used in diode-pumped solid-state lasers.
Doped with europium it forms Eu:YVO4, the dominant red  phosphor used in cathode ray tubes especially in color TVs.

Basic properties
Crystal structure:
Zircon tetragonal (tetragonal bipyramidal)
 Space group D4h
 Lattice parameters a = b = 7.119 Å, c = 6.290 Å 
Density: 4.24 g/cm3 
Melting point: 1810–1940 °C 
Mohs hardness: glass-like, ~5
Knoop hardness: 480 kg/mm2 
Thermal expansion coefficient:
 αa = 4.43×10−6/K
 αc = 11.37×10−6/K
Thermal conductivity coefficient:
parallel to c-axis: 5.23 W·m−1·K−1
perpendicular to c-axis: 5.10 W·m−1·K−1
Refractive indices, birefringence ( Δn = ne - no) and walk-off angle at 45° (ρ):
at 0.63 μm:
ne = 2.2154
no = 1.9929
Δn = 0.2225
ρ = 6.04
at 1.30 μm:
ne = 2.1554
no = 1.9500
Δn = 0.2054
ρ= 5.72
at 1.55 μm:
ne = 2.1486
no = 1.9447
Δn = 0.2039
ρ = 5.69
Sellmeier equation (λ in μm): 
ne2=4.59905 + 0.110534/(λ2 − 0.04813) − 0.012267612 λ2
no2=3.77834 + 0.069736/(λ2 − 0.04724) − 0.0108133 λ2

See also
Neodymium-doped yttrium orthovanadate

References

Vanadates
Yttrium compounds
Optical materials
Crystals